Namioka Dam is a rockfill dam located in Aomori Prefecture in Japan. The dam is used for irrigation. The catchment area of the dam is 15.3 km2. The dam impounds about 55  ha of land when full and can store 7600 thousand cubic meters of water. The construction of the dam was started on 1973 and completed in 1982.

References

Dams in Aomori Prefecture
1982 establishments in Japan